Edwuin Alexander Pernía Martínez (born 12 February 1995) is a Venezuelan footballer who plays as a forward for Deportes Iquique.

Career statistics

Club

Notes

References

External links

1995 births
Living people
Venezuelan footballers
Venezuelan Primera División players
Venezuelan expatriate footballers
Association football forwards
Caracas FC players
Deportes Iquique footballers
C.S. Emelec footballers
Chilean Primera División players
Ecuadorian Serie A players
Venezuelan expatriate sportspeople in Chile
Expatriate footballers in Chile
Expatriate footballers in Ecuador